The New York Collegiate Baseball League (NYCBL) is a collegiate summer baseball league founded in 1978 and sanctioned by the National Alliance of College Summer Baseball, National Amateur Baseball Federation and Major League Baseball. Each NYCBL team plays a 42-game schedule starting in 2017, down from 46 previously, from June to July with three teams from each division making a three-round playoff. Several players from this league have become Major Leaguers.  The league has teams located in central and western New York.

Teams

West

Dansville Gliders
Genesee Rapids (Houghton, New York)
Hornell Steamers
Horseheads Hitmen
Olean Oilers

East

Cortland Crush
Rochester Ridgemen
Sherrill Silversmiths
Syracuse Salt Cats
Syracuse Spartans

Champions
2022 – Cortland Crush
2021 – Cortland Crush
2020 – Season cancelled due to COVID-19 pandemic
2019 – Niagara Power
2018 – Onondaga Flames
2017 – Hornell Dodgers
2016 – Olean Oilers
2015 – Olean Oilers
2014 – Hornell Dodgers
2013 – Oneonta Outlaws
2012 – Syracuse Jr. Chiefs
2011 – Oneonta Outlaws
2010 – Amsterdam Mohawks
2009 – Amsterdam Mohawks
2008 – Brockport Riverbats
2007 – Elmira Pioneers
2006 – Saratoga Phillies
2005 – Hornell Dodgers
2004 – Amsterdam Mohawks
2003 – Amsterdam Mohawks
2002 – Hornell Dodgers
2001 – Rome Indians
2000 – Hornell Dodgers
1999 – Newark Raptors
1998 – Geneva Knights
1997 – Ithaca Lakers
1996 – Ithaca Lakers
1995 – Hornell Dodgers
1994 – Ithaca Lakers
1993 – Little Falls Diamonds
1992 – Little Falls Diamonds
1991 – Broome Rangers
1990 – Little Falls Diamonds
1989 - Cortland Apples
1988 – Schenectady Mohawks
1987 – Cohocton Red Wings
1986 – Cohocton Red Wings
1985 – Broome Rangers
1984 – Broome Rangers
1983 – Broome Rangers
1982 – Cortland Apples
1981 – Broome Rangers
1980 – Broome Rangers
1979 – Syracuse Chiefs
1978 – Syracuse Chiefs

Alumni
Active Major Leaguers:
Mike Fiers
JD Martinez
Tim Locastro
Former Major Leaguers:
Jeremy Accardo
Glen Barker
Clay Bellinger
Dallas Braden
Scott Cassidy
Archi Cianfrocco
Logan Darnell
Rajai Davis
Brendan Harris
Tim Hudson
Josh Kinney
Steve Kline
Greg Larocca
Brad Lidge
Kirt Manwaring
John McDonald
Tim Naehring
Hunter Pence
Earl Snyder

References

External links
New York Collegiate Baseball League website
Collegiate Summer Baseball Register website

Summer baseball leagues
Sports in Rochester, New York
Sports leagues established in 1978
Baseball in Vermont
Baseball leagues in New York (state)
College baseball leagues in the United States
1978 establishments in New York (state)